KLCN was an American radio station airing a Classic Hits format. Formally licensed to Blytheville, Arkansas, broadcasting on 910 kHz AM. The station served the areas of Blytheville, Arkansas, Dyersburg, Tennessee, Covington, Tennessee, and Kennett, Missouri for nearly 90 years. In the mid-1930s, among the blues musicians who performed live on the station were Calvin Frazier and James Peck Curtis.  The station was owned by Sudbury Services, Inc.

Sudbury surrendered the license for KLCN to the Federal Communications Commission (FCC) on December 31, 2018, who subsequently cancelled it.

References

External links
FCC Station Search Details: DKLCN (Facility ID: 63606)
FCC History Cards for KLCN (covering ,1927-1981)

Classic hits radio stations in the United States
LCN
Defunct radio stations in the United States
Radio stations established in 1927
1927 establishments in Arkansas
Radio stations disestablished in 2018
2018 disestablishments in Arkansas
LCN